Alatuncusia is a genus of moths of the family Crambidae.

Species
Alatuncusia bergii (Möschler, 1890)
Alatuncusia canalis 
Alatuncusia fulvescens (Hampson, 1918)
Alatuncusia gilvicostalis Hampson, 1918
Alatuncusia subductalis

References

Dichogamini
Crambidae genera
Taxa named by Hans Georg Amsel